Cytosolic 5'-nucleotidase 3 (NTC53), also known as cytosolic 5'-nucleotidase 3A, pyrimidine 5’-nucleotidase (PN-I or  P5'NI), and p56, is an enzyme that in humans is encoded by the NT5C3, or NT5C3A, gene on chromosome 7.

This gene encodes a member of the 5'-nucleotidase family of enzymes that catalyze the dephosphorylation of nucleoside 5'-monophosphates. The encoded protein is the type 1 isozyme of pyrimidine 5' nucleotidase and catalyzes the dephosphorylation of pyrimidine 5' monophosphates. Mutations in this gene are a cause of hemolytic anemia due to uridine 5-prime monophosphate hydrolase deficiency. Alternatively spliced transcript variants encoding multiple isoforms have been observed for this gene, and pseudogenes of this gene are located on the long arm of chromosomes 3 and 4. [provided by RefSeq, Mar 2012]

Structure
The NT5C3 gene consists of 10 exons and can be alternatively spliced at exon 2. Four possible isoforms have been identified, encoding proteins with lengths of 336 residues, 297 residues, 286 residues, and 285 residues. The 286-residue long isozyme is a monomeric protein containing 5 cysteine residues and no disulfide bridges or phosphate content. It has a predicted mass of 32.7 kDa and a predicted globular tertiary structure consisting of approximately 30% α-helices and 26% extended strands. This enzyme structurally resembles members of the haloacid dehalogenase (HAD) superfamily in regards to the shared α/β-Rossmann-like domain and a smaller 4-helix bundle domain. Three motifs in the α/β-Rossmann-like domain form the catalytic phosphate-binding site. Motif I is responsible for the 5′-nucleotidase activity: the first Asp makes a nucleophilic attack on the phosphate of the nucleoside monophosphate substrate, while the second Asp donates a proton to the leaving nucleoside. The active site is located in a cleft between the α/β-Rossmann-like domain and 4-helix bundle domain.

Function
NT5C3 is a member of the 5'-nucleotidase family and one of the five cytosolic members identified in humans. NTC53 catalyzes the dephosphorylation of the pyrimidine 5′ monophosphates UMP and CMP to the corresponding nucleosides. This function contributes to RNA degradation during the erythrocyte maturation process. As a result, NT5C3 regulates both the endogenous nucleoside and nucleotide pool balance, as well as that of pyrimidine analogs such as gemcitabine and AraC.

NT5C3 was first discovered in red blood cells, but its expression has been observed in multiple tumors (lung, ovary, colon, bladder), fetal tissues (lung, heart, spleen, liver), adult testis, and the brain. In particular, the 297-residue isoform of this enzyme is highly expressed in lymphoblastoid cells.

Clinical Significance
The loss of NT5C3 in pyrimidine 5' nucleotidase deficiency, an autosomal recessive condition, leads to the accumulation of high concentrations of pyrimidine nucleotides within erythrocytes. This deficiency is characterized by moderate hemolytic anemia, jaundice, splenomegaly, and marked basophilic stippling, and has been associated with learning difficulties. Two homozygous mutations identified in this gene produced large deletions that could cripple the enzyme’s structure and function, and are thus causally linked to pyrimidine 5' nucleotidase deficiency and hemolytic anemia. Heterozygous mutations in pyrimidine 5' nucleotidase deficiency may contribute to the large variability in thalassemia phenotypes. Pyrimidine 5' nucleotidase deficiency is also linked to the conversion of hemoglobin E disease into an unstable hemoglobinopathy-like disease. NT5C3 is identical to p36, a previously identified alpha-interferon-induced protein involved in forming lupus inclusions. Since NT5C3 can metabolize AraC, a nucleoside analog used in chemotherapy for acute myeloid leukemia patients, genotyping one of its polymorphisms may aid detection of patients who will respond favorably to this therapy.

Interactions
NTC53 is known to interact with pyrimidine nucleoside monophosphates, specifically UMP and CMP, as well as the anineoplastic agents 5’-AZTMP and 5’-Ara-CMP.

References

Further reading